Aloha Summer is a 1988 American comedy-drama film directed by Tommy Lee Wallace and starring Chris Makepeace, Yuji Okumoto, Tia Carrere and Don Michael Paul. The plot is about a group of teenagers and their experiences one summer in Hawaii.

Premise
In 1959, an American teenager travels from the Contiguous United States to Hawaii with his parents for a vacation and meets five other teenagers.  The film follows the teenagers as they learn about surfing, drinking, sex, and friendship.

Reception 
Caryn James of The New York Times called it "empty nostalgia done for its own sake".  Kevin Thomas of the Los Angeles Times wrote the film surprises viewers with its depth and themes, which include racism.  TV Guide wrote, "Though they didn't create a very good movie, the filmmakers had their hearts in the right place, and for that they should be commended."

References

External links
 
 
 
 

1988 films
1980s teen comedy-drama films
American teen comedy-drama films
Films set in 1959
Films set in Hawaii
Films shot in Hawaii
Films directed by Tommy Lee Wallace
1980s English-language films
1980s American films